East Bowes is a town in the Mid West region of Western Australia.

References 

Towns in Western Australia
Shire of Northampton